Forces of Nature is an  2004 American IMAX 3D documentary film about strong forces that shape the Earth's surface.
It is produced by the National Geographic Society, and includes coverage of
Earthquakes - a history of earthquakes in Turkey, by Ross Stein.
Volcanoes - a volcanic eruption on the island on Montserrat, by volcanologist Dr. Marie Edmonds.
Tornadoes - chasing tornadoes in the Midwestern United States, by Joshua Wurman and a team of tornado chasers.

It is directed by George Casey and narrated by Kevin Bacon.

References

External links
 

IMAX short films
2004 films
American documentary films
Documentary films about natural disasters
National Geographic Society films
Storm chasing
IMAX documentary films
2000s English-language films
2000s American films